Atlantic Jet was a passenger ferry service which operated between Fortune, Newfoundland, Canada and St. Pierre and Miquelon, an overseas collectivity of France. The service was operated by SPM Express SA, and used a high speed catamaran. The service was discontinued in 2009 due to an engine problem and was replaced by a traditional passenger-only ferry, the MV Arethusa.

References

External links 

 Travelling to St. Pierre & Miquelon
 St. Pierre Transportation at Virtual Tourist
 St. Pierre et Miquelon
 The Atlantic Jet web site was at spmexpress.net; this domain is now cybersquatted

Transport in Saint Pierre and Miquelon
Ferry companies of Newfoundland and Labrador